The British Nationality Act 1948 was an Act of the Parliament of the United Kingdom on British nationality law which defined British nationality by creating the status of "Citizen of the United Kingdom and Colonies" (CUKC) as the sole national citizenship of the United Kingdom and all of its colonies.

The Act, which came into effect on 1 January 1949, was passed in consequence of the 1947 Commonwealth conference on nationality and citizenship, which had agreed that each of the Commonwealth member states would legislate for its own citizenship, distinct from the shared status of "Commonwealth citizen" (formerly known as "British subject").

The CUKC consolidated British citizenship by putting Britain's colonial subjects on equal footing with those living in the British Isles, and was likely an attempt to avoid decolonisation. Similar legislation was passed in most of the other Commonwealth countries. The Act was largely the result of a bipartisan ideological commitment to "a definition of citizenship including Britons and colonial subjects under the same nationality" and at a time "before large-scale migration was considered possible". 

It formed the basis of the United Kingdom's nationality law until the British Nationality Act 1981, which came into force in 1983. Most of its provisions have been repealed or otherwise superseded by subsequent legislation, though parts remain in force.

Background to the Act

Broadly speaking, nationals of the United Kingdom, the Dominions, and the various British colonies had always shared a common citizenship status of "British subject". However, in 1946 the Canadian parliament passed the Canadian Citizenship Act, which established a separate Canadian citizenship. In response, a Commonwealth conference met in London in 1947, where it was agreed that each of the Commonwealth member states would be free to legislate for its own citizenship, while still retaining elements of a common Commonwealth citizenship. 

The resulting legislation passed by the United Kingdom for itself and its colonies was the British Nationality Act 1948, which was introduced by a Labour government. It marked the first time that married British women gained independent nationality, regardless of the citizenship of their spouses. Legislation passed in the other Commonwealth countries included Australia's Nationality and Citizenship Act 1948, New Zealand's British Nationality and New Zealand Citizenship Act 1948, and Southern Rhodesia's Southern Rhodesian Citizenship and British Nationality Act, 1949.

Provisions of the Act

The Act created the new status of "citizen of the United Kingdom and Colonies" (CUKC) for people born or naturalised in either the United Kingdom or one of its colonies.  Provision was also made in certain circumstances for citizenship to be acquired by descent from a CUKC, or by registration.

Despite the fact that the Channel Islands and the Isle of Man were neither part of the United Kingdom proper nor were colonies of it, article 33 of the Act provides that when the Act mentions colonies, it must be construed as including references to these Islands. Islanders were allowed, upon personal wish and not as a compulsory denomination, to be presented as "citizens of the United Kingdom, Islands and Colonies". This does not constitute a separate category of citizens but is merely a formal denomination.

Reform of the Act, and subsequent Acts

Between 1962 and 1971, as a result of popular opposition to immigration by Commonwealth citizens from Asia and Africa, the United Kingdom gradually tightened controls on immigration by British subjects from other parts of the Commonwealth. The Immigration Act 1971 introduced the concept of patriality, by which only British subjects with sufficiently strong links to the British Islands (i.e. the United Kingdom, the Channel Islands and the Isle of Man) had right of abode, the right to live and work in the United Kingdom and Islands.

Most of the 1948 Act was replaced by the British Nationality Act 1981 with effect from 1 January 1983.

The Act today
The only significant provision of the Act to survive today is section 3, which concerns the extra-territorial jurisdiction of the criminal courts over crimes committed by British subjects overseas. Generally, British criminal law does not apply to things done overseas, but there are some exceptions for acts done abroad by British subjects, such as murder. Section 3 restricted the scope of this jurisdiction to CUKCs (except in respect of crimes that would be against UK law even if committed by aliens). This was necessary so that, for example, a Canadian citizen who committed murder in Canada could not be prosecuted for it in a British court instead of in Canada.

As modified by section 51 of the British Nationality Act 1981, section 3 now restricts this jurisdiction to British citizens, British Overseas Territories citizens, British Overseas citizens and British Nationals (Overseas). Note, however, that section 3 is subject to any subsequent legislation to different effect, such as section 72 of the Sexual Offences Act 2003.

Furthermore, in spite of the fact that most of this Act has been repealed by the British Nationality Act 1981, the acquisition of new categories of British nationality created by the 1981 Act is often made dependent on one's nationality status prior to the effective date of the British Nationality Act 1981. This therefore means that many of the original provisions of the British Nationality Act 1948 are still relevant today.

See also
 History of British nationality law
 British nationality law
 Immigration Act

References

British nationality law
Immigration law in the United Kingdom
United Kingdom Acts of Parliament 1948